The Satellite Award for Best Actress in a Television Series – Musical or Comedy is one of the annual Satellite Awards given by the International Press Academy.

Winners and nominees

1990s

2000s

2010s

2020s
}

References

External links	
 Official website

Actress Television Series Musical or Comedy
Television awards for Best Actress